Gurbaj Singh (born 9 August 1988) represented India in men's hockey during the 2012 London Olympics.

He is a midfielder and plays in the right-half position.  Gurbaj made his India debut in 2006 at the Asian Games in Doha, Qatar. He represented India at the 2010 World Cup in New Delhi, 2010 Commonwealth Games in New Delhi, the 2010 Asian Games in Guangzhou, China, and the 2012 London Olympics.

He was a member of the 2007 Asia Cup winning squad in Chennai and the silver medal winning teams at the 2010 and 2014 Commonwealth Games.

In domestic hockey, he represents Punjab Police (employers) and Punjab state in the nationals. His earlier club was Air India.

References

External links

1988 births
Living people
Field hockey players at the 2012 Summer Olympics
Olympic field hockey players of India
Field hockey players from Punjab, India
Field hockey players at the 2014 Commonwealth Games
Asian Games medalists in field hockey
Field hockey players at the 2006 Asian Games
Field hockey players at the 2010 Asian Games
Field hockey players at the 2014 Asian Games
Indian male field hockey players
Asian Games gold medalists for India
Asian Games bronze medalists for India
Commonwealth Games silver medallists for India
Field hockey players at the 2010 Commonwealth Games
Commonwealth Games medallists in field hockey
Medalists at the 2010 Asian Games
Medalists at the 2014 Asian Games
Hockey India League players
Delhi Waveriders players
South Asian Games silver medalists for India
South Asian Games medalists in field hockey
2010 Men's Hockey World Cup players
2014 Men's Hockey World Cup players
Medallists at the 2010 Commonwealth Games
Medallists at the 2014 Commonwealth Games